Bernadette Bascom (born 1962 in Baltimore) is an American R&B singer.

The daughter of Civil Rights activist Rev. Marion C. Bascom, she began her career as a disc jockey in Baltimore, Maryland. Bascom was the first artist signed to Stevie Wonder's label Black Bull, and she later forged a great recording career in the Pacific Northwest. For fifteen years, Bascom sang on the Las Vegas strip, and she was the co-star in the award-winning show Divine Divas. She was also one of the Motown Moments at the Motown Cafe. Bascom recorded for her own labels Penguin and Solidarity Records, distributed through D-Town Records. Her standout performance of "Seattle Sunshine" is still her trademark song and she has worked with Elton John, Lenny Williams, and others.

In 2004, Bascom returned to Seattle where she has taught vocal lessons, performance, and production. She is the creator of "PRAISE!, a Sunday Gospel Supper," which has run at The Triple Door in downtown Seattle.

Bascom is a resident of Bothell, a northeastern suburb of Seattle, where she manages the Northshore Wranglers Program as a vocal coach. Room 315 at the Anderson School is dedicated to her.

References

External links

 Bascom's website

1962 births
American rhythm and blues singers
Living people
Musicians from Baltimore
Musicians from Seattle
Singers from Maryland
Singers from Washington (state)